Andrej Petrovski (born 18 April 1996) is a Macedonian cyclist, who currently rides for German amateur team Möbel Ehrmann.

Career
Born in Kumanovo, Petrovski began cycling at the age of 10 in his native country. He then moved to Germany with his family, where his father continued to coach him.

In 2014, he joined the World Cycling Centre's development team. Later that year, he competed at the cyclo-cross world championships in the junior race, finishing 32nd. This made him the first ever Macedonian to compete at the world championships.

In 2015, Petrovski finished tenth overall in the Tour of Ankara with the Macedonian national team.

During the 2016 season, Petrovski joined UC Monaco, after an impressive performance at the Giro della Valle d'Aosta.

In May 2017, while competing for Monaco, he won the bronze medal in the road race at the Games of the Small States of Europe.

In 2018, Petrovski joined the German team . In June, he became a dual national champion, winning both the Macedonian national road race and time trial championships.

Major results

2015
 10th Overall Tour of Ankara
2017
 3rd  Road race, Games of the Small States of Europe
2018
 National Road Championships
1st  Road race
1st  Time trial
2019
 National Road Championships
1st  Road race
1st  Time trial
2021
 1st  Time trial, National Road Championships

References

External links

1996 births
Living people
Macedonian male cyclists
European Games competitors for North Macedonia
Cyclists at the 2019 European Games